Al Bdeir Sport Club, is an Iraqi football team based in Al-Qādisiyyah, that plays in Iraq Division Two.

Managerial history
 Ahmed Jomaa
 Rahim Zoghaiyer
 Abdul-Zahra Odeh
 Tariq Taima

See also 
 2021–22 Iraq Division Two

References

External links
 Al Bdeir SC on Goalzz.com
 Iraq Clubs- Foundation Dates

1992 establishments in Iraq
Association football clubs established in 1992
Football clubs in Al-Qādisiyyah